Hechuan is a town under the administration of Anze County, Shanxi, China.

Administrative divisions 
, it has 18 villages under its administration:
Hechuan Village
Shangxian Village
Xihongyi Village
Donghongyi Village
Kongwang Village
Shiqu Village
Lingnan Village
Jing Village
Fajing Village
Qinhezhuang Village
Luoyun Village
Chedao Village
Shuangtou Village
Yiting Village
Beiyadi Village
Anshang Village
Shangtian Village
Hedong Village

References 

Township-level divisions of Shanxi
Anze County